The men's 110 metres hurdles event  at the Friendship Games was held on 18 August 1984 at the Grand Arena of the Central Lenin Stadium in Moscow, Soviet Union.

Medalists

Results

Heats
Wind:Heat 1: -1.1 m/s, Heat 2: -0.3 m/s

Final
Wind: -0.5 m/s

See also
Athletics at the 1984 Summer Olympics – Men's 110 metres hurdles

References
 
 

Athletics at the Friendship Games
Friendship Games